Nikolai Petrovich Ignatev (16 December 1917 — 4 August 1994) was a Soviet fighter pilot during World War II. Awarded the title Hero of the Soviet Union on 13 April 1944 for his initial victories, he went on to achieve a final tally of 22 solo and 11 (or possibly 13) shared shootdowns.

References 

1917 births
1994 deaths
Soviet World War II flying aces
Heroes of the Soviet Union
Recipients of the Order of Lenin
Recipients of the Order of the Red Banner
Recipients of the Order of the Red Star
Pilots who performed an aerial ramming